Antonela Ayelen Curatola (born 23 October 1991) is an Argentine volleyball player. She is a member of the Argentina women's national volleyball team.

She was part of the Argentine national team at the 2014 FIVB Volleyball Women's World Championship in Italy, and played for Vélez Sarsfield in 2014.

Clubs
  Vélez Sarsfield (2014)

References

External links
 Profile at FIVB.org

1991 births
Living people
Argentine women's volleyball players
Place of birth missing (living people)
Volleyball players at the 2015 Pan American Games
Pan American Games competitors for Argentina
Setters (volleyball)